The Millennium of Russia is a bronze monument in the Novgorod Kremlin. It was erected in 1862 to celebrate the millennium of Rurik's arrival to Novgorod, an event traditionally taken as a starting point of the history of Russian statehood.

History
A competition to design the monument was held in 1859. An architect Viktor Hartmann and an artist Mikhail Mikeshin were declared the winners. Mikeshin's design called for a grandiose, 15-metre-high globus cruciger on a bell-shaped pedestal. It was to be encircled with several tiers of sculptures representing Russian monarchs, clerics, generals, and artists active during various periods of Russian history.

Mikeshin himself was not a sculptor, therefore the 129 individual statues for the monument were made by the leading Russian sculptors of the day, including his friend  and the promising new sculptor, Alexander Opekushin. Rather unexpectedly for such an official project, the tsars and commanders were represented side by side with sixteen eminent personalities of Russian culture: Lomonosov, Pushkin, Lermontov, Gogol, Karl Brullov, Mikhail Glinka, etc. As for the Russian rulers, Ivan the Terrible is famously absent from the monument due to his role in the 1570 pillage and massacre of Novgorod by the Oprichnina. Alongside the Muscovite princes, the medieval Lithuanian dynasts such as Gediminas or Vytautas the Great who reigned over the Eastern Slavs of the present-day Belarus and Ukraine are represented.

The most expensive Russian monument up to that time, it was erected at a cost of 400,000 roubles, mostly raised by public subscription. In order to provide an appropriate pedestal for the huge sculpture, sixteen blocks of Sortavala granite were brought to Novgorod, each weighing in excess of 35 tons. The bronze monument itself weighs 100 tons. 

At the time when the monument was inaugurated, many art critics felt that it was overloaded with figures. Supporters regard Mikeshin's design as harmonious with the medieval setting of the Kremlin, and subtly accentuating the vertical thrust and grandeur of the nearby 11th-century Saint Sophia Cathedral.

During World War II, the Germans dismantled the monument, and prepared it to be transported to Germany. However, the Red Army regained control of Novgorod and the monument was restored to public view in 1944. A 5-ruble commemorative coin was released in the USSR in 1988 to commemorate the monument.  The Millennium of Baptism of Russia was the first state-sponsored national and religious festival since the cessation of the State atheistic policy during the early 1980s.

Upper level

Middle level

Bottom level

Gallery

References

External links 
  History and description on the website of the Novgorod administration

Outdoor sculptures in Russia
1862 works
Buildings and structures in Veliky Novgorod
Russian Revival architecture
Bronze sculptures in Russia
Tourist attractions in Novgorod Oblast
Monuments and memorials in Russia
Freemasonry in Russia
Cultural heritage monuments of federal significance in Novgorod Oblast